Chicago May (1871–1929) was the nickname of Mary Anne Duignan, an Irish-born criminal who became notorious in the U.S., United Kingdom and France. She referred to herself as the "queen of crooks" and sometimes used the name May Churchill.

Early life
She was born in Edenmore, Ballinamuck, County Longford, Ireland. In 1890, at the age of 19, she stole the proceeds earned by her parents from a recent cattle fair and ran away to Liverpool, England where she bought new clothes and booked a ticket to America. Upon arrival in New York she supported herself by prostitution and picking pockets. She moved to Nebraska to stay with her uncle, where she met a criminal, Dal Churchill, whom she married, but the marriage was brought to a sudden end when her husband was lynched after an attempted train robbery. The marriage gave her American citizenship.

She moved to Chicago to take advantage of the large influx of visitors at the 1893 World's Columbian Exposition. She teamed with another prostitute. One robbed customers while the other was having sex with them. She returned to New York City, where she worked as a dancer, but was soon arrested for stealing a wallet, earning her first jail sentence. She briefly married friend Jim Sharpe but the couple soon separated. After this, she called herself May Churchill Sharpe. She soon established herself with the local criminal underworld, becoming involved in various crimes, mostly of a petty nature, including fraud, assault, brawling, drunk and disorderly behavior, beggary and pickpocketing.

Criminal heyday

She had various criminal lovers, but she graduated from petty criminality to major crime when she met Eddie Guerin, who organised a robbery of the American Express office in Paris. May was imprisoned for her role in the crime. She operated her schemes on four continents and in nine countries. She reached the height of her career in England, when she was taken up by aristocrat Sir Sidney Hamilton Gore, who is said to have proposed marriage to her - shortly before he shot himself.

After Guerin escaped from a French prison island, he made his way to London where he met May again, but the relationship turned sour. She took up with a burglar named Charley Smith. In 1907, during an altercation with Guerin, Smith shot him, wounding him in the foot. Smith and May were both accused of attempted murder. May was convicted and sentenced to 15 years. She was released in 1917, and returned to the U.S.

Later years
By the 1920s, she was living in Detroit and had become destitute. No longer young, she was reduced to propositioning men on the streets and was repeatedly arrested for soliciting and common prostitution. She hoped to make money from her former notoriety by writing magazine articles and an autobiography with the help of a journalist, which was published in 1928 as Chicago May, Her Story, by the Queen of Crooks. Her former lover Guerin published his own life story at the same time, under the title I Was a Bandit. She died on May 30, 1929 at the age of 58.

References

Further reading
Fictionalised book..Chicago May by Harry Duffin, self published by Spiderwize copyright 2010. 

King, Betty Nygaard. Hell Hath No Fury: Famous Women in Crime. Ottawa: Borealis Press, 2001. , .

1871 births
1929 deaths
Irish female criminals
People from County Longford
People from Chicago
People from Detroit
American prostitutes